Yonkerville is an unincorporated area in northwestern Barry County, Missouri, United States. It is located approximately three miles west of Monett and two miles south of Pierce City at the intersection of U.S. Route 60 and Route 97. The Monett Municipal Airport is also located near the community.

References

Unincorporated communities in Barry County, Missouri
Unincorporated communities in Missouri